The Saint Joe River (sometimes abbreviated St. Joe River) is a  long tributary of Coeur d'Alene Lake in northern Idaho. Past Calder, it flows into Benewah County and through the town of St. Maries, where it receives its largest tributary, the Saint Maries River. It then turns northwest, passing through Heyburn State Park before reaching its mouth just north of the Kootenai County line. Much of the river's route through Heyburn State Park is partially flooded due to raised water levels from the Washington Water Power dam at Post Falls on the Spokane River below Coeur d'Alene Lake. Multiple rivers in Canada are both higher and navigable, including the Babine, and Middle Rivers.   

In 1978,  of the river were protected by the National Wild and Scenic Rivers System, with  designated as wild and another  designated as recreational.

The Saint Joe River drains  of the Idaho Panhandle. It is part of the Spokane River watershed, which in turn is part of the Columbia River basin. About 68 percent is owned by the United States Forest Service (the St. Joe National Forest), 4 percent is owned by the Bureau of Land Management, 2 percent is owned by the State of Idaho, and the rest is privately owned.

The Saint Joe River watershed is covered primarily by mixed coniferous forest, which includes species such as Douglas fir, true fir, larch, and pine. Alder is common in the riparian zones of high altitude river valleys, while cottonwood dominates the lower altitude riparian zones, much of which have been converted to agricultural land. Rush, sedge, and cattails are common in the river's floodplains, which are also used to grow wild rice.

The river is home to many species of fish, including native westslope cutthroat trout, mountain whitefish, cedar sculpin and other cottids, shiners, and nonnative rainbow and brook trout, chinook and Kokanee Salmon. The upper Saint Joe River is also home to the last self-sustaining population of vulnerable bull trout in the Coeur d'Alene Lake watershed.

See also
Cedar Snags, National Register-listed area along the North Fork, where large tree stumps in a swampy area survive from the Great Fire of 1910
List of rivers of Idaho
List of longest streams of Idaho
List of National Wild and Scenic Rivers
Tributaries of the Columbia River

References

External links
St. Joe River Country Documentary produced by Idaho Public Television

Rivers of Idaho
Rivers of Benewah County, Idaho
Rivers of Shoshone County, Idaho
Idaho Panhandle National Forest
Wild and Scenic Rivers of the United States